The R466 road is a regional road in Ireland which runs southeast-northwest from the R445 at Birdhill, County Tipperary to the R352 in East Clare.

After leaving the R445 at Birdhill it passes through Montpelier before crossing the River Shannon at O'Briensbridge in County Clare via a narrow 14-arch bridge.

See also
Roads in Ireland
National primary road
National secondary road

References
Roads Act 1993 (Classification of Regional Roads) Order 2006 – Department of Transport

Regional roads in the Republic of Ireland
Roads in County Tipperary
Roads in County Limerick
Roads in County Clare